The 1977 South Australian state election was held on 17 September 1977.

The Liberal Movement had dissolved since the previous election, with some of its members rejoining the Liberal Party and others forming part of the new Australian Democrats. For the two sitting LM members, their seats are listed as held by the LM.

Retiring Members

Labor
Jack Jennings MHA (Ross Smith)

Liberal
Ernest Allen MHA (Frome)
John Coumbe MHA (Torrens)
Murray Vandepeer MHA (Millicent)

House of Assembly
Sitting members are shown in bold text. Successful candidates are highlighted in the relevant colour. Where there is possible confusion, an asterisk (*) is also used.

References

Candidates for South Australian state elections
1977 elections in Australia
1970s in South Australia